This is a shortened version of the eighth chapter of the ICD-9: Diseases of the Respiratory System. It covers ICD codes 460 to 519. The full chapter can be found on pages 283 to 300 of Volume 1, which contains all (sub)categories of the ICD-9. Volume 2 is an alphabetical index of Volume 1. Both volumes can be downloaded for free from the website of the World Health Organization.

Acute respiratory infections (460–466)
  Acute nasopharyngitis (common cold)
  Acute sinusitis
  Sinusitis, acute, maxillary
  Sinusitis, acute, frontal
  Sinusitis, acute, NOS
  Pharyngitis, acute
  Tonsillitis, acute
  Acute laryngitis and tracheitis
  Laryngitis, acute, no obstruction
  Epiglottitis, acute
  Croup
  Acute upper respiratory infections of multiple or unspecified sites
  Upper respiratory infection, acute, NOS
  Acute bronchitis and bronchiolitis
  Bronchitis, acute
  Bronchiolitis, acute, due to RSV

Other diseases of the upper respiratory tract (470–478)
  Deviated nasal septum
  Polyp, nasal cavity
  Chronic pharyngitis and nasopharyngitis
  Rhinitis, chronic
  Chronic sinusitis
  Sinusitis, chronic, maxillary
  Sinusitis, chronic, frontal
  Sinusitis, chronic, NOS
  Chronic disease of tonsils and adenoids
  Hypertrophy of tonsils and adenoids
  Tonsillar hypertrophy alone
  Tonsil/adenoid disease, chronic, unspec.
  Peritonsillar abscess
  Chronic laryngitis and laryngotracheitis
  Laryngitis, chronic
  Allergic rhinitis
  Rhinitis, allergic, due to pollen
  Rhinitis, allergic, due to animal dander
  Rhinitis, allergic, cause unspec.
  Other diseases of upper respiratory tract
  Abscess/ulcer of nose

Pneumonia and influenza (480–488)
  Viral pneumonia
  Pneumonia, SARS associated coronavirus
  Pneumonia, viral, unspec.
  Pneumococcal pneumonia
  Other bacterial pneumonia
  Pneumonia, bacterial, unspec.
  Pneumonia due to other specified organism
  Mycoplasma pneumoniae
  Bronchopneumonia, organism unspecified
  Pneumonia, organism unspecified
  Influenza
  Influenza w/ pneumonia
  Influenza w/ other respiratory manifestations
  Influenza due to identified Avian influenza virus
  Influenza due to identified 2009 H1N1 virus

Chronic obstructive pulmonary disease and allied conditions (490–496)
  Bronchitis, not specified as acute or chronic
  Chronic bronchitis
  Emphysema
  Emphysematous bleb
  Other emphysema
  Asthma
  Extrinsic asthma
  Intrinsic asthma
  Chronic obstructive asthma
  Bronchiectasis
  Extrinsic allergic alveolitis
  Chronic airway obstruction, not elsewhere classified
  COPD, Not Otherwise Specified

Pneumoconioses and other lung diseases due to external agents (500–508)
  Coal workers' pneumoconiosis
  Asbestosis
  Pneumoconiosis due to other silica or silicates
  Pneumoconiosis due to other inorganic dust
  Pneumonopathy due to inhalation of other dust
  Pneumoconiosis, unspecified
  Respiratory conditions due to chemical fumes and vapors
  Pneumonitis due to solids and liquids
  Respiratory conditions due to other and unspecified external agents
  Acute pulmonary manifestations due to radiation
  Chronic and other pulmonary manifestations due to radiation

Other diseases of respiratory system (510–519)
  Empyema
  Pleurisy
  Pleurisy without effusion or current tuberculosis
  Pleurisy with effusion with a bacterial cause other than tuberculosis
  Other specified forms of pleural effusion except tuberculous
  Malignant pleural effusion
  Other specified forms of effusion, except tuberculous
  Pleural effusion, NOS
  Pneumothorax
  Pneumothorax, spontaneous
  Abscess of lung and mediastinum
  Pulmonary congestion and hypostasis
  Postinflammatory pulmonary fibrosis
  Other alveolar and parietoalveolar pneumonopathy
  Idiopathic fibrosing alveolitis
 Hamman-Rich syndrome
  Lung involvement in conditions classified elsewhere
  Rheumatic pneumonia
  Lung involvement in systemic sclerosis
  Acute chest syndrome
  Lung involvement in other diseases classified elsewhere
  Other diseases of lung
  Atelectasis
  ARDS
  Respiratory failure, acute
  Other diseases of respiratory system
  Mediastinitis

International Classification of Diseases